Abaddon is an Italian extreme metal band from Emilia-Romagna, formed in 1999. It is heavily associated with sister band Spectrum-X.

History

Early history and first album (1999-2003) 
Abaddon was created in Chicago Illinois in 1999, initially as a solo-project of Nullifer Bones with accompanying live musicians.

The first musical creation to be released was an untitled demo released in 1999 on Nullifer Bones's birthday, August 2.

Later that year (1999), the first full length EP, Entitled Master, was released in limited print cassette tape form on September 9, 1999.

During this period the band toured throughout Illinois & Wisconsin including The Rave / Eagles Club.

Joining of Candy Bones (2004-2009) 
In 2004 founder Nullifer Bones moved to Italy where he created the project Spectrum-X with his future wife, musician Candy Bones.

A few tracks created for the Master EP from 1999 were performed live and some were used on a Spectrum-X demo entitled Dreambook which was released in 2004.

In 2006 Candy Bones joined the project as bassist; during this period they created mostly atmospherical black metal and classical music with a dark ambient feel.

The musical tracks they created in these years ended up being used on the Spectrum-X albums "Tea Party with Zombies" and "Darkest Night Ever,"  which were released by the Japanese record label Darkest Labyrinth.

During this period they were featured in many different magazines including Gothic Bible to advertise the Japanese Goth subculture accessories company Suppurate System, Kera magazine for heavy metal subculture clothing, German gothic magazine Dark Spy, and finally Alamode magazine for the Darkest Labyrinth compilation album and festival.

In 2008 they toured in Osaka and Tokyo. They returned again in 2010.

Recommencing exclusive activity (2010-2016) 
In 2010 Abaddon returned to creating music exclusively for use under the name Abaddon.

Later in the year Zack Undead joined the project as 2nd guitarist.

On September 12, 2012 they released a single--"The bringer of light"—in a limited print USB flash drive and t-shirt package.

Current activity leading up to upcoming album (2017-present) 
In 2017 the band announced that they were nearing the release of their newest album. (name yet to be revealed)

On June 11, 2017 Abaddon released the first track to be revealed for their upcoming album, a single entitled "Dominator" and an official music video for the track.

On August 10, 2017 Abaddon released the 2nd track for the same album, a single entitled "Mark Ov Emptiness" together with another official music video.

Music Videos (official videos) 
 The Bringer of light (sample 2012)
 The Bringer of light, sample (updated logo and links 2017)
 Dominator
 Mark Ov Emptiness

Discography

Demos 
 Untitled (1999)

Singles 
 The bringer of light (2012)
 Dominator (2017)
 Mark Ov Emptiness (2017)

Associated Albums 
 Spectrum-X Dreambook (2004) Spectrum-X
 Spectrum-X Tea Party With Zombies (2006) Spectrum-X
 Spectrum-X Tea Party With Zombies (2008)Spectrum-X
 Spectrum-X Darkest Night Ever (2008)Spectrum-X

Studio albums 
 Master (1999)
 (no name given yet and unreleased) (2017)

Members

Current members 
 Nullifer Bones Lead vocalist guitarist and more (1999–present)
 Candy Bones Bassist (2006–present)
 Zack Undead guitarist (2010–present)

Current Live musicians 
 Francesco Migliorini drummer (2017–present)

References

External links 
 Abaddon Official Website

Italian black metal musical groups
Musical groups established in 1999
Blackened death metal musical groups
Musical quartets
1999 establishments in Italy